This is a list of stations with services provided by Via Rail.

 
Lists of railway stations in Canada